The India National Youth Orchestra is the national youth orchestra of India. The group's aim is to help young musicians to develop their talents and expose them to an orchestral setting. Approximately 150 musicians play in the orchestra. They perform a wide variety of music, notably ones from their home country of India.

History 
The orchestra was formed by Vijay Upadhyaya. He believed that there was a limitation in solo repertoire and gave a lesson to the orchestra such that children of all ages and classes could collaborate effectively. He enlisted children who played Western instruments, making up most of the orchestra.  In January 2011, Upadhyaya held auditions followed by a ten-day workshop in Kolkata to train candidates. A concert was held on 26 April 2011 at Kala Mandir. The program contained string serenades written by Elgar and Tchaikovsky, the Simple Symphony by Benjamin Britten and Concerto in A Minor by Antonio Vivaldi.

See also 
 List of youth orchestras

References

External links
Official website

Youth orchestras
Indian orchestras